Yong Kuong Yong (born 18 September 1988 in Port Dickson) is a Malaysian footballer. He is currently playing for CRC Penang in FAP Division 1. He can played in a multitude of roles, including as a full back, centre back, central midfielder and occasionally as a striker.

Career
Yong started his career playing for his hometown team Negeri Sembilan Chinese for the Malaysian Chinese Football Association (MFCA) League, under coach Christopher Khoo. He later leaves his hometown to Kuala Lumpur to play in Kuala Lumpur FA youth team, and was promoted to the senior team in 2009.

He transferred to Felda United FC for the 2012 season. On 10 January 2012, in his league debut for Felda United, he scored in a 2–0 victory over his former club, Kuala Lumpur FA. He scored his second goal in a 1–0 win over PBDKT T-Team FC on 30 June 2012.

Yong signed for Perak FA for the 2013 season.

In November 2013, Yong signed for Malaysia Premier League side, Penang FA.

Career statistics

Club

International
.

International career
He has been called up to Malaysia national football team in 2010 & 2015. He made his debut for Malaysia against Yemen on 27 February 2010.

Yong was also playing for the Malaysia U-23 team. He was called up to the SEA Games U-23 squad in October 2011 after impressive performance in Malaysia Cup. He made his first appearances against Nepal and manage to score one goal. Yong has also shown a tremendous performance on his first appearance in the SEA Games helping the Malaysia national team to wins 4–1 against Cambodia through one assist.

Style of play
At the start of his career, Yong plays as a midfielder and occasionally as a striker at Kuala Lumpur, FELDA United and Perak. When he transferred to Penang, he was converted as centre-back by Coach K. Devan, due to his height, aggressiveness, speed and mainly lack of choice of centre back players in the squad at the time due to injuries. He adapted the position so well that he becomes the first choice centre-back for Penang.

In 2015 Malaysia Premier League, under coaching of Jacksen F. Tiago, Yong was converted to right-back. Due to his exceptional stamina, Yong is able to provide crosses upfield and  defend effectively against an opponent's attack down the flanks. Which make him the most appearances player for Penang FA in 2015 and thus help the team to be promoted to 2016 Malaysia Super League.

Honours

Club
CRC Negeri Sembilan
MCFA Cup: 2006
Penang
Malaysia Premier League: Promotion 2015
 CRC Penang
PCFA Cup: 2019
Tanjong Cup: Runners-up 2019

International
Malaysia U23
 SEA Games: 2011

References

External links
 
 Yong Kuong Yong ingin popular at Murai.com.my
 

1988 births
Living people
Malaysian sportspeople of Chinese descent
Malaysian footballers
Malaysia international footballers
Kuala Lumpur City F.C. players
Felda United F.C. players
Perak F.C. players
Penang F.C. players
Terengganu FC players
People from Negeri Sembilan
Malaysia Super League players
Association football wingers
Association football forwards
Association football utility players
Southeast Asian Games gold medalists for Malaysia
Southeast Asian Games medalists in football
Competitors at the 2011 Southeast Asian Games